Maria Rowohlt (born as Maria Pierenkämper; 5 June 1910 in Bochum – 11 April 2005 in Hamburg) was a German actress. She was married several times, amongst others to Max Rupp and to Ernst Rowohlt.

External links 
 

1910 births
2005 deaths
German film actresses
People from Bochum
People from the Province of Westphalia